José Eduardo Calzada Rovirosa (born August 21, 1964) is a Mexican politician and member of the Partido Revolucionario Institucional who has served as Senator for the state of Querétaro in the Mexican Senate from 2006 to 2009 and as the Governor of Querétaro from 2009 to 2015.

He subsequently served as the Secretary of Agriculture (Secretario de Agricultura, Ganadería, Desarrollo Rural, Pesca y Alimentación in the Mexican federal government, from 2015 to 2018.

References

Living people
1964 births
Governors of Querétaro
Mexican Secretaries of Agriculture
Institutional Revolutionary Party politicians
21st-century Mexican politicians
Politicians from Querétaro
People from Querétaro City